Leopoldo Trieste (3 May 1917 – 25 January 2003) was an Italian actor, film director and script writer.

Trieste was born in Reggio Calabria. He worked with directors such as Pietro Germi, Francis Ford Coppola, Giuseppe Tornatore, Mario Bava, Tinto Brass, Charles Vidor, René Clément and Federico Fellini.

Trieste died of a heart attack.

Filmography as actor

Preludio d'amore (1947) as Paolo
The White Sheik (1952) as Ivan Cavalli
The Counterfeiters (1953) as Brigadiere Caputo
I vitelloni (1953) as Leopoldo Vannucci
A Day in Court (1954) as Leopoldo
Dov'è la libertà? (1954) as Abramo Piperno
Un americano a Roma (1954) as Spettatore alla TV
Via Padova 46 (1954) as The Man with a Cigarette
Il segno di Venere (1955) as Pittore
Buonanotte... avvocato! (1955) as Neighbor (uncredited)
Il padrone sono me (1955) as Il filosofo
Destinazione Piovarolo (1955) as L'ispettore delle ferrovie
Il coraggio (1955) as Rag. Rialti
We're All Necessary (1956) 
Un eroe dei nostri tempi (1957) as Aurelio
A Farewell to Arms (1957) as Passini
Città di notte (1958)
I ragazzi dei Parioli (1959) as Anarchist
Tutti innamorati (1959) as Cipriani
Avventura a Capri (1959) as Professore Cavicchio
Il moralista (1959) as The Advertising Designer
Le svedesi (1960) as Alessio
Che gioia vivere (1961) as Anarchist artist
Un giorno da leoni (1961) as Michele
Divorce, Italian Style (1961) as Carmelo Patanè
La smania addosso (1963) as Calogero Lo Niro
Il successo (1963) as Grassi
Seduced and Abandoned (1964) as Il barone Rizieri Zappalà
Panic button (1964)
Via Veneto (1964)
Le voci bianche (1964) as 'Orapronobbi'
F.B.I. operazione Baalbeck (1964) as Pagani
Bianco, rosso, giallo, rosa (1964) as Il psichiatra
Sedotti e bidonati (1964) as don Marcuzzo
L'ombrellone (1966) as Professor Ferri
Una vergine per il principe (1966) as Davide
Una questione d'onore (1966) as Advocate Mazzullo
Spara più forte, non capisco (1966) as Carlo Saporito
A ciascuno il suo (1967) as Deputato Comunista
Assicurasi vergine (1967) as Lorenzino Conozza
La ragazza del bersagliere (1967) as Sergeant
La cintura di castità (1967) as Minor Role
Gente d'onore (1967)
Escalation (1968) as Il sacerdote / il santone
Il medico della mutua (1968) as Pietro
The Shoes of the Fisherman (1968) as Dying Man's Friend
La prova generale (1968)The Secret of Santa Vittoria (1969) as VittoriniLe clan des siciliens (1969) as Turi - l'expert en timbresTogli le gambe dl parabrezza (1969)Pussycat, Pussycat, I Love You (1970) as Desk ClerkUna macchia rosa (1970) as L'attoreThe Adventures of Gerard (1970) as Marshal Henri MassenaL'asino d'oro: processo per fatti strani contro Lucius Apuleius cittadino romano (1970) as RufinioThe Martlet's Tale (1970)Crepa padrone, crepa tranquillo (1970)La Poudre d'escampette (1971) as Le sergent du fortLa vacanza (1971) as JudgeA Bay of Blood (1971) as PaoloIl sorriso del ragno (1971)Trastevere (1971) as Il professoreReazione a catena (1971)Stress (1971)Racconti proibiti... di niente vestiti (1972) as Husband of FioraUna cavalla tutta nuda (1972) as Marito di GemmataEvery Little Crook and Nanny (1972) as TruffatoreColpiscono senza pietà (1972) as MarcovicAnche se volessi lavorare, che faccio? (1972) as Maresciallo CapriottiIl tuo piacere è il mio (1973)Viaggia, ragazza, viaggia, hai la musica nelle vene (1973)Don't Look Now (1973) as Hotel ManagerLa signora è stata violentata (1973) as The psychoanalystFischia il sesso (1974) as LeonardCommissariato di notturna (1974) as Brigadiere SpanòL'albero dalle foglie rosa (1974) Amore mio non farmi male (1974) as Avv. MusumeciIl saprofita (1974)The Godfather Part II (1974) as Signor RobertoI baroni (1975) as Il cerimoniereL'ammazzatina (1975) as Tuccio LangattaVergine e di nome Maria (1975) as NicolaDue cuori, una cappella (1975) as Custode cimiteroSon tornate a fiorire le rose (1975) as PattavinaLezioni private (1975) as The ExhibitionistRoma drogata: la polizia non può intervenire (1975)Perdutamente tuo...mi firmo Macaluso Carmelo fu Giuseppe (1976) as don Calogero LiottaLezioni di violoncello con toccata e fuga (1976) as SilenzioL'uomo di Corleone (1977)Il giorno dell'Assunta (1977)Caligola (1979) as ChariclesThe Black Stallion (1979) as PriestL'albero della maldicenza (1979) as Don CiccoPiedone d'Egitto (1980) as Prof. Coriolano CerulloPiso pisello (1981) as The trampIl marchese del Grillo (1981) as Padre SabinoMalamore (1982) as L'amministratoreTrenchcoat (1983) as Esteban OrtegaEnrico IV (1984) as PsychiatristMomo (1986) as BeppoIl nome della rosa (1986) as Michele da CesenaIl coraggio di parlare (1987) as Don BrunoStradivari (1988) as Nicolò AmatiNuovo cinema Paradiso (1988) as Father AdelfioDon Bosco (1988) as Don BorelI giorni randagi (1988) as CaronteThe Dark Sun (1990) as Alfonso IsgròViaggio d'amore (1990) as The CarrettiereIl giudice ragazzino (1994) as Mr. LivatinoItalia Village (1994)L'uomo delle stelle (1995) as MuteOjos de amatista (1996)Marianna Ucria (1997) as Pretore CamaleoIl manoscritto del principe (2000) as Lucio PiccoloIl consiglio d'Egitto (2002) as Padre SalvatoreLegami di famiglia (2002)Quota 16'' (2011) as Giovanni (final film role)

References

External links

1917 births
2003 deaths
People from Reggio Calabria
Italian male film actors
David di Donatello winners
Nastro d'Argento winners
Italian film directors
Giallo film directors